= Live in Anaheim =

Live in Anaheim may refer to:

- Live in Anaheim (EP), a 2004 EP by Simple Plan
- Live in Anaheim (Ian Gillan album), 2008
